The 1928 St Marylebone by-election was held on 30 April 1928.  The by-election was held due to the resignation of the incumbent Conservative MP, Douglas Hogg.  It was won by the Conservative candidate Rennell Rodd.

References

St Marylebone by-election
St Marylebone,1928
St Marylebone by-election
St Marylebone,1928
St Marylebone by-election